Florin Popescu (born 30 August 1974 in Iancu Jianu, Olt) is a Romanian sprint canoer who competed from the mid-1990s to 2005. Competing in two Summer Olympics, he won two Olympic medals at Sydney in 2000 with teammate Mitică Pricop (gold: C-2 1000 m, bronze: C-2 500 m). He won a total of seven world championship gold medals (and nineteen total) as well as seven European championship golds, making him the most successful Romanian paddler of modern times.

Injury forced Popescu to retire at the end of the 2005 season after winning his seventh world title (C-4 500 m) at the World Championships in Zagreb, Croatia.

Popescu is 183 cm (6'0") tall and raced at 79 kg (174 lbs). He lists his interests as football, motor racing and handball. He was voted Romanian Sportsman of the Year in 1993.

References

External links
 
 

1974 births
Living people
People from Olt County
Canoeists at the 2000 Summer Olympics
Canoeists at the 2004 Summer Olympics
Olympic canoeists of Romania
Olympic gold medalists for Romania
Olympic bronze medalists for Romania
Romanian male canoeists
Olympic medalists in canoeing
ICF Canoe Sprint World Championships medalists in Canadian
Medalists at the 2000 Summer Olympics